Michael, Mick or Mike O'Rourke is the name of:

 Michael O'Rourke (gambler) (1862–1882, alias "Johnny-Behind-the-Deuce"), professional gambler of the Old West
 Michael James O'Rourke (1878–1957), Canadian recipient of the Victoria Cross
 Mick O'Rourke (1946–2019), Irish Gaelic footballer and hurler who played for Offaly
 Mike O'Rourke (athlete) (born 1955), New Zealand javelin thrower
 Mike O'Rourke (baseball) (1868–1934), Major League Baseball pitcher